Curt Bogislaus Ludvig Kristoffer von Stedingk (26 October 1746 – 7 January 1837) was a count of the von Stedingk family, and a successful Swedish army officer and diplomat who played a prominent role in Swedish foreign policy for several decades.

Biography

Early life
Von Stedingk was born in Swedish Pomerania on 26 October 1746. His father was Major Kristoffer Adam Stedingk and his mother was Countess Kristina Charlotta von Schwerin, daughter of Frederick the Great's famous Field Marshal Kurt Christoph von Schwerin.

He married Ulrika Fredrika Ekström and became the father of one son and five daughters, who married into the noble families af Ugglas, Biörnstierna, von Platen, d'Otrante and Rosenblad; he was the father of the composer Maria Fredrica von Stedingk. During the Seven Years' War, while Sweden was at war with Prussia, the 13-year-old Curt was an ensign in the personal regiment of the Crown Prince of Sweden.

After the war ended, he went to Sweden to claim compensation for damage done to his family's estate in Pomerania. This goal was not achieved, but von Stedingk was introduced to the court and became friends with the crown prince and his brothers.

In Canada, the lineage continues with Baron Vicko von Stedingk and his wife Baroness Paula von Stedingk.

Career

Military career

In 1763, after von Stedingk completed his studies at Uppsala University, he began his military career, and rose quickly through the ranks in the Royal Suédois regiment in France, which was owned by his friend count Axel von Fersen. Both von Stedingk and Axel von Fersen were both close friends of Louis XVI and Marie Antoinette and spent much time in Versailles. By 1788, he had become colonel en chef, and by 1783, he was in charge of a larger army unit in Finland, then an internal part of Sweden.

During the American Revolutionary War, when France sent troops under the command of Marquis de LaFayette in support of the American colonies, von Stedingk went overseas to America in 1779.

At the siege of Savannah in October 1779, he commanded the left column of the attacking force, and planted the American flag on the last line of enemy trenches, but was wounded by enemy crossfire, and forced to retreat, with 20 men, all wounded like he was. For this, he was decorated by the French and received a lifetime pension.

He was also recognized as a hero for his acts during the naval Battle of Grenada fought against Vice Admiral John Byron on 6 July 1779.  For his feats in battle, von Stedingk was made a member of the Society of the Cincinnati by George Washington in 1783.

During the Russo-Swedish War started by King Gustav III in 1788, von Stedingk commanded the defence of Savolax. His forces repeatedly defeated Russian forces that greatly outnumbered the Swedes, and von Stedingk was promoted to major general.

He was Ambassador to Russia in St. Petersburg in two turns – all in all almost 20 years.
In the Russo-Swedish War 1808–1809 he was commander-in-chief in Finland, which still belonged to Sweden. Thanks to his very good standing with the Russian Imperial Family he later managed to alleviate the harsh terms of the peace negotiations when Finland was lost to Russia.

In the Battle of Leipzig he successfully commanded the Swedish troops against Napoleon.
He was promoted to field marshal.

Death and afterward
Von Stedingk died at age 90 in Stockholm, and is said to have been mourned by both the King of Sweden, at that time, Charles XIV John, and the armed forces.

References

Other sources
 Hofberg et al., Svenskt biografiskt handlexikon 1906, Albert Bonnier publishing company. Available at Project Runeberg.
von Platen, Carl Henrik (1995)  Stedingk: Curt von Stedingk (1746–1837) : kosmopolit, krigare och diplomat hos Ludvig XVI, Gustav III och Katarina den stora (Atlantis) 

1746 births
1837 deaths
Field marshals of Sweden
Swedish nobility
Swedish people of German descent
Military personnel of the American Revolutionary War
Uppsala University alumni
Knights Grand Cross of the Order of the Sword
Recipients of the Order of St. Anna
Commanders Grand Cross of the Order of the Sword
18th-century diplomats
18th-century Swedish military personnel
18th-century Swedish people
Recipients of the Order of Military Merit (France)
Swedish military commanders of the Napoleonic Wars
Ambassadors of Sweden to the Russian Empire
Gustavian era people
People from Swedish Pomerania